Bragbury End is a hamlet in Hertfordshire, England, and the location of Stevenage F.C.'s training ground.

Hamlets in Hertfordshire
Stevenage